Sun was an Alternative rock band from Mönchengladbach, Germany with English lyrics and styles described as Crossover and Progressive rock.

The band was founded in 1991 by Ralf Aussem and Jörg Schröder. 
Sun was considered for long time on critics as "German answer" of Pearl Jam or Tool. 
Furthermore, the band supported Pearl Jam on their Ten Release Tour in 1992 and also Monster Magnet in the year 1995.

Two years after founding their band they got their Majordeal on the label Gun Records. 
The band became good known by their albums Murdernature, XXXX and Nitro as also by co-projects for sequels of the serial rock sampler Crossing All Over. 
Further, the band used instruments atypical of rock, like English flutes.

In the year 2001 the band split up after different exchanges of bandmembers and severe illness of their singer. Their founder and musicwriter Ralf Aussem plays currently in the Scottish/German band Dead Guitars

Members
 Ralf Aussem (songwriting, guitar) - founder of Sun; current band: Dead Guitars -
 Jörg Schröder (vocals) and founder of Sun
 Holger Seeling (bass)
 Peter Körfer (guitar)
 Jörg Schneider (drums)
 Björn Lucker (drums)
 Kurt Schmidt (bass)
&  Bogdan Skowronek (orig.drummer)

Discography
 1991 - Urban Glowing
 1992 - Murdernature
 1993 - Jam House Wah
 1994 - XXXX
 1996 - Nitro
 1998 - Launches (Best Of)
 2001 - Sun

As support band
for Pearl Jam (1992)
for Monster Magnet (1995)

External links
Biography Sun

German alternative rock groups
Musical groups established in 1991
Musical groups disestablished in 2001
German progressive rock groups
1991 establishments in Germany
2001 disestablishments in Germany
People from Mönchengladbach
Musical groups from North Rhine-Westphalia
GUN Records artists